The 1980–81 Penn State Nittany Lions basketball team represented Pennsylvania State University in the 1980–81 season.

Roster

Schedule

Source

References 

1980
1980–81 NCAA Division I men's basketball independents season
1980 in sports in Pennsylvania
1981 in sports in Pennsylvania